Khalid Choukoud (born 23 March 1986, Fez) is a Dutch track and field athlete who specializes in the marathon.

On the track, he finished seventh in the 10,000 metres at the 2012 European Championships. He competed without finishing at the 2016 European Championships half marathon.

On April 11, 2021, he set his current personal best in the Marathon of 2:09:55 during the 2021 IAAF Xiamen Tuscany Camp Elite Marathon in Sienna, Italy, which qualified him for the 2020 Summer Olympics .

Personal bests

Outdoor

Marathon - 2:09:55 (Sienna 11 April 2021)

References

1986 births
Living people
Moroccan emigrants to the Netherlands
Dutch male long-distance runners
Athletes (track and field) at the 2020 Summer Olympics
Olympic athletes of the Netherlands